Berndt Leopold Katter (15 October 1932 – 20 July 2014) was a Finnish former modern pentathlete and Olympic medalist. He thrived at the national level in water-polo (national gold), swimming and fencing.

Civilian life
Besides his sport career, Katter worked in SOK, the Turku Lamp, OPA Ltd, Humppila Glass and Sylvi Salonen Oy's service.

Katter had three children: musician Thomas Katter, Niclas v. Bonsdorff, and Christofer v. Bonsdorff. He was married with textile-artist Riitta Suomi. They lived in Turku.

Achievements
 1956 Summer Olympics:
team competition: bronze, individual competition: 16th.
 1960 Summer Olympics:
team competition: 4th, individual competition: 12th
 World championships
1959: team competition: silver, individual competition: 5th

References

External links
 https://web.archive.org/web/20121108073930/http://www.abc.net.au/olympics/2008/results/historical/athletes/9723.htm
 Competitor no. 11, Berndt Katter (Finland) running along a creek bed in the pentathlon, Olympic Games, Melbourne, 28 November 1956 [picture].
 Summer Olympics 2000 Olympic history -- Modern pentathlon
 Kodin kääntöpiiri

1932 births
2014 deaths
Finnish male modern pentathletes
Olympic bronze medalists for Finland
Olympic medalists in modern pentathlon
Olympic modern pentathletes of Finland
Modern pentathletes at the 1956 Summer Olympics
Modern pentathletes at the 1960 Summer Olympics
Finnish male water polo players
Sportspeople from Helsinki
Medalists at the 1956 Summer Olympics